"Go for Yours" is a song recorded by Lisa Lisa and Cult Jam that appeared on the 1988 soundtrack to the film, Caddyshack II. As a single, it reached number 19 on the Billboard R&B singles chart in 1988. In 1990, this song was later covered by Deedee Magno Hall on an episode of The Mickey Mouse Club.

Charts

References 

1988 singles
Lisa Lisa and Cult Jam songs
1988 songs
Columbia Records singles
Song recordings produced by Full Force